Dennis Bennie is an entrepreneur and early-stage investor based in Toronto, Canada. He co-founded Mission Electronics in 1979; co-founded Aviva Software in 1982; co-founded Delrina in 1988; raised two venture funds under XDL Group and is currently a mentor, advisor and angel investor to early-stage technology companies.

Career
Bennie qualified as a chartered accountant in 1975. He entered the world of technology in 1979, when he co-founded Mission Electronics, a high-end home entertainment equipment producer. In 1982, he sold his interest in Mission and co-founded Aviva Software, a PC software developer. The company expanded to include software distribution and in 1986 merged with Ingram Micro to become Canada’s largest software distributor.

From 1988 to 1996, Bennie was co-founder, Chairman and CEO of Delrina Corporation, which forged new software strategies and was best known for producing WinFax. Listed on both the Toronto Stock Exchange and NASDAQ, Delrina was sold to Symantec in 1995 for share consideration valued at $760 million.

In 1996, he founded the first XDL Venture Fund, focusing on early-stage technology opportunities. The XDL funds raised a total of $185 million venture capital and are fully invested. Bennie currently manages the XDL Capital Group, investing at the venture and angel levels.

Venture Investments
Current active venture investments include ScribbleLive, Sensibill, Q4 Inc., and Akumin.

Angel Investments
Current active angel investments include Quandl, Thalmic Labs Inc., Nuco, Platterz, Vouchr, Newtopia Inc., Tulip Retail, Nymi Inc., Linkett, Validere Technologies, Interaptix Inc, Edsby, Mimosa Diagnostics Inc., Luminari, and Xanadu.

Creative Destruction Lab
Bennie is one of the co-founders of the Creative Destruction Lab at the Rotman School of Management. The Creative Destruction Lab is a seed-stage program focusing on the transition stage from pre-seed to seed-stage funding.

Investment Exits
 Appinions Inc., acquired
 Backweb Technologies Inc., IPO
 Commtouch (now Cyren), IPO
 Delano Technology Corp., IPO
 Entercept Security Technologies, acquired
 Firmex, acquired
 Lanacom Inc., acquired
 Lorex Technology (now Lorex by FLIR), acquired
 MGI Software, acquired
 Mill Street Brewery, acquired
 Netect, Ltd., acquired
 Reimage Inc., acquired 
 Semagix, Inc., acquired
 Tucows, IPO

References

External links
Bio at Official XDL Site
Tech Pioneer Eren Niazi

Living people
Year of birth missing (living people)